Proverbs 6 is the sixth chapter of the Book of Proverbs in the Hebrew Bible or the Old Testament of the Christian Bible. The book is a compilation of several wisdom literature collections, with the heading in 1:1 may be intended to regard Solomon as the traditional author of the whole book, but the dates of the individual collections are difficult to determine, and the book probably obtained its final shape in the post-exilic period. This chapter is a part of the first collection of the book.

Text
The original text is written in Hebrew language. This chapter is divided into 36 verses.

Textual witnesses
Some early manuscripts containing the text of this chapter in Hebrew are of the Masoretic Text, which includes the Aleppo Codex (10th century), and Codex Leningradensis (1008). 

There is also a translation into Koine Greek known as the Septuagint, made in the last few centuries BC; some extant ancient manuscripts of this version include Codex Vaticanus (B; B; 4th century), Codex Sinaiticus (S; BHK: S; 4th century), and Codex Alexandrinus (A; A; 5th century).

Analysis
This chapter belongs to a section regarded as the first collection in the book of Proverbs (comprising Proverbs 1–9), known as "Didactic discourses". The Jerusalem Bible describes chapters 1–9 as a prologue of the chapters 10–22:16, the so-called "[actual] proverbs of Solomon", as "the body of the book". 

The structure of chapter involves some advices:  
Advises release from foolish indebtedness (1–5)
Admonishes avoiding laziness (6–8)
Warns of the danger of poverty (9–11) and deviousness (12–15), 
Lists conduct that the Lord hates (16–19) 
Warns about immorality (20–35).

The New King James Version entitles the chapters and sections as follows:
Dangerous Promises (verses 1–5)
The Folly of Indolence (verses 6–11)
The Wicked Man (verses 12–19)
Beware of Adultery (verses 20–35)

Four warnings (6:1–19)
This section contains four miscellaneous sayings which are more reminiscent of the proverbial sayings in chapters 10–31 than the instructions in chapters 1–9: 
Warning against acting as guarantor for debts (verses 1–5)
Warning against laziness and encourage diligence (verses 6–11) 
Warning of the danger of scoundrel (verses 12–15) 
Warnings of things that the Lord hates (verses 16–19)

Verses 16–19 contain a graded numerical saying (cf. Proverbs 30:15–31; Job 5:19; Amos 1:3–2:8) that is particularly useful both as a means of classification and as an aid to memorization. The saying lists 'different kinds of malicious and disruptive activity through a review of the unhealthy body': 'eyes… tongue… hands… heart… feet' (cf. Proverbs  4:23–27), with the addition of 'false witness' and 'one who stirs up strife' to make up the seven vices.

Verse 1
My son, if you become surety for your friend,
If you have shaken hands in pledge for a stranger,
"Surety": or "guaranty", "collateral" There are several references to suretyship in Proverbs, the first coming here (verses 1–6). According to Perowne, Accordingly, the writer of Proverbs "has no quarter for it, but condemns it unsparingly on every mention of it". Subsequent references to surety are at Proverbs 11:15, 17:18, 20:16, 22:26 and 27:13.
"Shaken": in Hebrew literally "struck" as in "struck hands in pledge" (NIV), that is, a handshake signaling the guarantee of a pledge (such as Proverbs 11:15; 17:18; 2 2:26, 2 Kings 10:15). An unwise guarantor would be threatened with not only 'penury' (cf. Proverbs 22:26–27) but also slavery (cf. 2 Kings 4:1–7; Nehemiah 5:1–8).

The price of adultery (6:20–35)
This passage focuses on the instruction to protect against the enticements of the seductress, in particular  here of "a married woman". An affair with the adulteress would exact a heavy price, 'a man's very life', as a jealous and enraged husband would seek revenge and demand a higher price than money (verses 34–35).

Verse 21
Bind them continually upon your heart,
and tie them around your neck.
"Bind them": an allusion to Deuteronomy 6:6–8 (cf. Proverbs 3:3, 24) where the people of Israel were told to bind a copy of the law on their foreheads and arms.

Verse 22
When you walk, their counsel will lead you.
When you sleep, they will protect you.
When you wake up, they will advise you.

Verse 23
For like a lamp is a commandment, and instruction is light,
and the way of life[a] is the reproof of discipline,

Verse 24
They will protect you
from the flattering words
of someone else's wife.

Verse 25
Don’t hunger in your heart after her beauty.
Don’t let her eyes capture you.

Verse 26
For the price of a woman, a prostitute,[a] is the price of a loaf of bread,
but the woman belonging to a man[b] hunts precious life.

Verse 27
Can a man carry fire in his lap
without burning his clothes?

Verse 28
Or can one walk on hot coals
and his feet not be scorched?

Verse 29
 It is just as dangerous to sleep with another man's wife. Whoever does it will suffer.

See also

Related Bible parts: Proverbs 1, Proverbs 2, Proverbs 7, Proverbs 9

References

Sources

External links
 Jewish translations:
 Mishlei - Proverbs - Chapter 6 (Judaica Press) translation [with Rashi's commentary] at Chabad.org
 Christian translations:
 Online Bible at GospelHall.org (ESV, KJV, Darby, American Standard Version, Bible in Basic English)
 Book of Proverbs Chapter 6 King James Version
  Various versions

06